Armen Hrant Donelian (born December 1, 1950) is a jazz pianist, composer, educator and author.

Donelian was classically trained at the Westchester Conservatory of Music in White Plains, New York. He has appeared since 1975 as a featured soloist and bandleader, and with an array of jazz musicians, including Sonny Rollins, in international venues. A composer of over 100 works reflecting Classical, Middle Eastern and jazz influences, Donelian has produced 13 albums.
He has received multiple awards as a Fulbright Senior Scholar and Specialist and an NEA Jazz Fellow. An educator at several New York institutions for 30 years, including The New School and William Paterson University, Donelian is also the author of Training The Ear Vol. 1 & 2 and offers master classes at leading throughout the world.
A graduate of Columbia University and private student of Michael Pollon, Carl Bamberger, Ludmila Ulehla, Harold Seletsky and Richie Beirach, Donelian is the co-founder with Marc Mommaas of the Hudson Jazz Workshop.

Discography

As leader/co-leader

As sideman
With Billy Harper
 Trying to Make Heaven My Home (MPS, 1979)
 The Believer (Baystate, 1980)
 The Billy Harper Quintet (Poljazz, 1981)
 Jazz Jamboree 1980 Various Artists (Polskie Nagrania Muza, 1983)

With Mongo Santamaria
 Afro-Indio (Vaya/Fania, 1975)
 Sofrito (Vaya/Fania, 1976)
 Mongo and Justo (Vaya/Fania, 1976)
 A La Carte (Vaya/Fania, 1976)

With Night Ark
 Moments (RCA/Novus, 1987)
 In Wonderland (PolyGram/EmArcy, 1996)
 Petals on Your Path (PolyGram/EmArcy, 1999)

With Bobby Vince Paunetto
 Commit to Memory (Pathfinder, 1976; Bomba, 1998)
 Composer in Public (RSVP, 1996)
 Reconstituted (RSVP, 1999)

With Rory Stuart
 Nightwork (Cadence, 1984)
 Hurricane (Sunnyside, 1987)

With Datevik Hovanesian
 Listen to My Heart (Sony, 1998)

With Julie Lyonn Lieberman
 Mixing America (Huiksi, 1996)
 With Roy Ayers
 Step into Our Life (Polydor, 1978)

With Cosmology
 Cosmology (Vanguard, 1978)

References 

 Leonard Feather, Ira Gitler: The Biographical Encyclopedia of Jazz. Oxford University Press, Oxford, New York 1999; 
 Thomas Staudter: "Armenian Music Inspires A Jazz Pianist" New York Times, February 10, 2002

External links
Armen Donelian's website
Interview with Armen Donelian

Jazz fusion pianists
Post-bop pianists
Jazz fusion keyboardists
Post-bop keyboardists
Columbia College (New York) alumni
American jazz pianists
American male pianists
Living people
Place of birth missing (living people)
1950 births
20th-century American pianists
21st-century American pianists
20th-century American male musicians
21st-century American male musicians
American male jazz musicians
Sunnyside Records artists
Fulbright alumni